Grace Horsley Darling (24 November 1815 – 20 October 1842) was an English lighthouse keeper's daughter. Her participation in the rescue of survivors from the shipwrecked Forfarshire in 1838 brought her national fame. The paddlesteamer ran aground on the Farne Islands off the coast of Northumberland in northeast England; nine members of the crew were saved.

Biography

Grace Darling was born on 24 November 1815 at her grandfather's house in Northumberland. She was the seventh of nine children (four brothers and four sisters) born to William and Thomasin Darling, and when only a few weeks old, she was taken to live on Brownsman Island, one of the Farne Islands, in a small cottage attached to the lighthouse. Her father ran the lighthouse (built in 1795) for Trinity House, and earned a salary of £70 per year with a bonus of £10 for satisfactory service. The accommodation was basic, and the lighthouse was not located in a good place to guide shipping to safety, so in 1826, the family moved to the newly constructed lighthouse on Longstone Island.

Longstone Lighthouse had better accommodation, but the island itself was slightly less hospitable, so William would row back to Brownsman to gather vegetables from their former garden and to feed the animals. The family spent most of their time on the ground floor of the lighthouse, which consisted of a large room, heated by a wooden stove. The room was their living room, dining room, and kitchen in one, and had a spiral staircase leading to three bedrooms above and the light at the top of the tower.

In the early hours of 7 September 1838, Darling, looking from an upstairs window, spotted the wreck and survivors of the Forfarshire on Big Harcar, a nearby low, rocky island. The Forfarshire had foundered on the rocks and broken in half; one of the halves had sunk during the night.

Darling kept the coble steady in the water, while her father helped four men and the lone surviving woman, Sarah Dawson, into the boat. Although she survived the sinking, Mrs. Dawson had lost her two young children (James, 7, and Matilda, 5) during the night. William and three of the rescued men then rowed the boat back to the lighthouse. Darling then remained at the lighthouse while William and three of the rescued crew members rowed back and recovered four more survivors.

Meanwhile, the lifeboat had set out from Seahouses, but arrived at Big Harcar rock after Darling and her father had completed their rescue operation; all they found were the bodies of Mrs Dawson's children and of a clergyman. Returning to North Sunderland was too dangerous, so they rowed to the lighthouse to take shelter. Darling's brother, William Brooks Darling, was one of the seven fishermen in the lifeboat. The weather deteriorated to the extent that everyone was obliged to remain at the lighthouse for three days before returning to shore.

The Forfarshire had been carrying 62 people. The vessel broke in two almost immediately upon hitting the rocks. Those rescued by Darling and her father were from the bow section of the vessel, which had been held by the rocks for some time before sinking. All that remained at daybreak was the portside paddlebox casing. Nine other passengers and crew had managed to float off a lifeboat from the stern section before it, too, sank, and were picked up in the night by a passing Montrose sloop, and brought into South Shields that same night.

As news of her role in the rescue reached the public, her combination of bravery and simple virtue set her out as exemplary, and led to an uneasy role as the nation's heroine. Grace and her father were awarded the Silver Medal for Bravery by the Royal National Institution for the Preservation of Life from Shipwreck, later named the Royal National Lifeboat Institution (RNLI). Subscriptions and donations totaling over £700 (equivalent to about £ in ) were raised for her, including £50 from Queen Victoria; more than a dozen portrait painters sailed to her island home to capture her likeness, and hundreds of gifts, letters, and even marriage proposals were delivered to her. Her unexpected wealth and fame were such that the Duke of Northumberland took on a role as her self-appointed guardian and founder of a trust, established to look after the donations offered to her. His personal gifts to her family and her included a timepiece and a silver teapot.

Death

In 1842, Darling fell ill while visiting the mainland and was in convalescence with her cousins, the MacFarlanes, in their house in Narrowgate, Alnwick. The Duchess of Northumberland heard of her situation, arranged for her to be moved to better accommodation close to Alnwick Castle, and tended to her in person, as well as providing her with the services of the ducal family physician. Darling's condition declined, however, and in the final stages of her illness, she was conveyed to the place of her birth, in Bamburgh. She died of tuberculosis, historically known as consumption, in October 1842, aged 26. She is buried in the churchyard of St Aidan's Church, Bamburgh. An independent canopied monument, with her sleeping effigy holding an oar, lies at the west edge of the churchyard, north of her grave, to provide a landmark for passing sailors. The original statue (which was eroding) lies within the church. The statue is by Charles Raymond Smith son of James Smith.

The church also has a stained-glass window in her memory.

Legacy
Darling's achievement was celebrated in her lifetime; she received a large financial reward in addition to the plaudits of the nation. A number of fictionalised depictions propagated the Grace Darling legend, such as Grace Darling, or the Maid of the Isles by Jerrold Vernon (1839), which gave birth to the legend of "the girl with windswept hair". Her deed was committed to verse by William Wordsworth in his poem "Grace Darling" (1843). A lifeboat with her name was presented to Holy Island. One of a series of Victorian paintings by William Bell Scott at Wallington Hall in Northumberland depicts her rescue efforts. The McManus Galleries in Dundee includes three paintings by Thomas Musgrave Joy that celebrate Grace Darling's deeds with the Forfarshire.

At Bamburgh, a museum is dedicated to her achievements and the seafaring life of the area. From 1990 to 2020 an RNLI Mersey-class lifeboat at Seahouses bore the name Grace Darling. Singer/songwriter Dave Cousins of Strawbs wrote "Grace Darling" (on the album Ghosts) in tribute and as a love song. The children's singing group The Limeliters sang a different "Grace Darling" (featuring the refrain "Help, help, came a desperate yelp!") in their 1962 album, recorded live in concert, Through Children's Eyes. In 2017, Duke Special set Michael Longley's poem "Grace Darling" to music and recorded it on the album Hallow. The Grace Darling Hotel, one of the oldest extant hotels in Melbourne, Victoria, opened in 1854.

See also

 Monument to Grace Darling in St Aidan's Churchyard
 Idawalley Lewis, an American lighthouse keeper noted for rescuing numerous people in the latter half of the 19th century
 Grace Bussell, a 16-year-old Australian girl who along with Sam Isaacs rescued 50 people from the SS Georgette when it foundered off the West Australian coast in 1876, is regarded as Australia's national heroine. At the time of the rescue, Bussell was referred to as the "Grace Darling of the West" by journalists.
 Ann Harvey, a Newfoundland 17-year-old who in 1828, with her father, brother, and dog, rescued 163 shipwrecked people
 Roberta Boyd, a New Brunswick girl who was hailed as the "Grace Darling of the St. Croix" after a rescue in 1882

References

Further reading
 Algernon Charles Swinburne's poem "Grace Darling". A poem of the same name and subject was published in 1910 by Scottish Border poet and Australian bush balladeer Will H. Ogilvie (1869–1963)
 Richard Armstrong: Grace Darling: Maid and Myth (1965)
 Hugh Cunningham: Grace Darling – Victorian Heroine Hambledon: Continuum (2008) 
 Thomasin Darling: Grace Darling, her True Story: from Unpublished Papers in Possession of her Family (1880)
 Thomasin Darling: The Journal of William Darling, Grace Darling's Father (1887)
 Eva Hope: Grace Darling – Heroine of the Farne Islands Walter Scott Publishing (1875)
 Jessica Mitford: Grace Had an English Heart. The Story of Grace Darling, Heroine and Victorian Superstar (1998) 
 Constance Smedley: Grace Darling and Her Times Hurst and Blackett (1932)
H. C. G. Matthew, "Darling, Grace Horsley (1815–1842)", Oxford Dictionary of National Biography, Oxford University Press, 2004
@RNLI: tweets as the voice of Grace Darling narrating her famous rescue in 'real time' on its 175th anniversary (2013)

External links
Grace Darling Museum from the RNLI
Grace Darling website
Information on Grace and the area in which she lived, including Seahouses, Bamburgh, Beadnell and the Farne Islands (most recently saved Web Archive snapshot of lost website)
Description of the sinking of the Forfarshire and Grace Darling’s part in the rescue, from The Tragedy of the Seas, 1841, from Google Book Search
 “Grace Darling: Victorian heroine” BBC
 “Grace Darling - Heroine of the sea” BBC
Grace Darling genealogy

1815 births
1842 deaths
19th-century deaths from tuberculosis
British lighthouse keepers
Women lighthouse keepers
Sea rescue in the United Kingdom
Tuberculosis deaths in England
People from Bamburgh
Burials in Northumberland
Lifesaving
Women of the Victorian era